Ribes niveum is a North American species of currant known by the common names snowy gooseberry, white-flowered gooseberry, or snow currant. It is native to the western United States (Washington, Idaho, Oregon, and Nevada with isolated populations in Colorado and New Mexico).

Ribes niveum is a shrub up to 3 meters (10 feet) tall, with white or pale pink flowers and dark blue or dark purple berries. Berries are edible but rather sour.

References

niveum
Plants described in 1834
Flora of the Western United States
Flora without expected TNC conservation status